Evolve is the second EP by American deathcore band Chelsea Grin, released on June 19, 2012 through Artery Recordings. It is the first release by the band with guitarist Jason Richardson taking up lead guitar since his departure from Born of Osiris and the last release to feature Andrew Carlston on drums. Evolve was mixed by Jason Suecof and was engineered by famed metal producer and Dååth guitarist, Eyal Levi.

Style
Musically, the album features slight progressive influence along with blending more melody when compared to their previous releases.

Background
Chelsea Grin first confirmed work for a new EP at the end of 2011. Soon after this announcement, founding lead guitarist Michael Stafford left the band and was replaced by Jason Richardson of Born of Osiris as a touring member, before Richardson left Born of Osiris while out on tour with the band; which in turn resulted in him joining Chelsea Grin full-time. On May 9, 2012, Artery began streaming the song "Lilith".

Evolve was tracked by Buckett at High Vibe Recordings, mixed by Jason Suecof at Audio Hammer Studios, and engineered by Dååth guitarist Eyal Levi.

Track listing

Personnel

Chelsea Grin
 
David Flinn – bass
Jacob Harmond – rhythm guitar
Dan Jones – lead and rhythm guitar
Alex Koehler – vocals 
Jason Richardson – lead guitar, programming
Andrew Carlston – drums

Production
Engineering by Eyal Levi
Mixing by Jason Suecof, @ Audio Hammer Studios
Tracking by Buckett
Layout by Mike Milford

Charts

References

2012 EPs
Chelsea Grin EPs
Artery Recordings albums
Albums produced by Jason Suecof